The Danish Minister for Justice is the head of the Ministry of Justice and a cabinet member.

As the head of the department, the minister is responsible for:
 The General judicial system including
 The Police of Denmark
 The Courts administration,
 the Danish Security and Intelligence Service

See also
List of Minister of Justice (Denmark)
Cabinet of Denmark

References

External links
The Justice Ministry of Denmark

Government ministerial offices of Denmark
 
Law of Denmark